The 2019 Football Victoria season refers to the soccer competitions contested under the organisation of Football Victoria in 2019. Across seven senior men's and six senior women's divisions, this was the 111th season of organised soccer in Victoria and the sixth following the latest competition restructure in 2013.

Overall, the season was characterised by greater media attention and broadcasting efforts within the NPL, but was somewhat-marred by disciplinary issues at both the NPL and State League levels. The first year under FV's newly-rebranded name, it also saw further restructures to the men's competition structure, changes to the National Club Identity Policy, as well as expansion of the NPL junior boys leagues.

League tables

2019 NPL Victoria

The 2019 National Premier Leagues Victoria season was played over 26 rounds. As premiers, Heidelberg United qualified for the 2019 National Premier Leagues finals series, competing with the other state federation champions in a final knockout tournament to decide the National Premier Leagues 2019 champion.

Finals

Promotion/relegation play-off

2019 NPL Victoria 2

The 2019 National Premier Leagues Victoria 2 season was played over 28 rounds with each team playing the teams in their conference twice and the other conference once. The top teams in each conference at the end of the season were promoted to National Premier Leagues Victoria, while the second-placed teams played-off to qualify for the promotion/relegation play-off with the 12th-placed team from the NPL.

NPL 2 West

NPL 2 East

State League 1

North-West

South-East

State League 2

North-West

South-East

State League 3

North-West

South-East

2019 NPL Victoria Women

The highest tier domestic football competition in Victoria for women is the National Premier Leagues Victoria Women. This was the fourth season of the NPL format. The 10 teams played each other 3 times for a total of 27 games.

Cup Competitions

2019 Dockerty Cup

Football Victoria soccer clubs competed in 2019 for the Dockerty Cup. The tournament doubled as the Victorian qualifiers for the 2019 FFA Cup, with the top four clubs progressing to the Round of 32. A total of 214 clubs entered the qualifying phase, with the clubs entering in a staggered format.

The Cup was won by Hume City, their first title.

In addition to the two A-League clubs (Melbourne Victory and Melbourne City), the four semi-finalists (Bulleen Lions, Hume City, Melbourne Knights and Moreland Zebras) competed in the final rounds of the 2019 FFA Cup.

References

2019 in Australian soccer
Soccer in Victoria (Australia)